Chris Clements (born March 2, 1987) is an American soccer player.

Career

Youth and college
Chris Clements was born in Allen, Texas. He attended Allen High School, played club soccer for the Dallas Texans, and played college soccer at the University of Tulsa where from 2005 until 2008, where he was selected to the All-Conference Third Team as a sophomore in 2006, and named to the NSCAA All-Midwest team and the NSCAA/adidas NCAA All-America Third Team as a junior.

Professional
Clements was drafted in the fourth round (60th overall) in the 2009 MLS SuperDraft by Columbus Crew, but was not offered a professional contract by the team.

Clements signed with the Minnesota Thunder of the USL First Division on April 15, 2007., and made his professional debut on April 18, 2009, in a game against the Austin Aztex.

On February 25, 2010, the NSC Minnesota Stars of the USSF Division 2 signed him. He was released by the club on November 29, 2011.

International
Clements was a member of the U20 National Team pool in the spring and summer of 2006.

Present Day
Clements is now an email nerd that codes sometimes, but not good.

References

External links
 Football Betting
 Tulsa profile

1987 births
Living people
American soccer players
Association football defenders
Columbus Crew draft picks
Minnesota Thunder players
Minnesota United FC (2010–2016) players
North American Soccer League players
People from Allen, Texas
Soccer players from Texas
Sportspeople from the Dallas–Fort Worth metroplex
Tulsa Golden Hurricane men's soccer players
USL First Division players
USSF Division 2 Professional League players